Bulalô is a beef dish from the Philippines. It is a light colored soup that is made by cooking beef shanks and bone marrow until the collagen and fat has been melted into the clear broth. It typically includes leafy vegetables (like pechay or cabbage), corn on the cob, scallions, onions, garlic, ginger, and fish sauce. Potatoes, carrots, or taro can also be added. It is commonly eaten on rice with soy sauce and calamansi on the side. Bulalo is native to the Southern Luzon region of the Philippines, particularly in the provinces of Batangas and Cavite.

Similar dishes in other parts of the Philippines include the Western Visayan cansi which is soured with batuan fruit; the Waray dish pakdol; and the Cebuano dish pochero.

See also
Nilaga
Cansi
Philippine cuisine

References

Philippine stews
Beef dishes
Philippine beef dishes